Howard "Harry" Edward Baldwin (June 3, 1900 – January 23, 1958) was a Major League baseball player.  He was a right-handed pitcher for two seasons with the New York Giants, beginning in 1924. Prior to playing for the Giants, Baldwin played for three seasons (1921–1923) with the minor league Newark Bears.

For his career, Baldwin compiled a 3–1 record in 11 appearances, with a 4.41 earned run average and 5 strikeouts.  He was a member of the Giants' pennant-winning team in 1924.

References

External links

Major League Baseball pitchers
Baseball players from Baltimore
New York Giants (NL) players
1900 births
1958 deaths